In linguistics, vowel length is the perceived length of a vowel sound: the corresponding physical measurement is duration. In some languages vowel length is an important phonemic factor, meaning vowel length can change the meaning of the word, for example in: Arabic, Estonian, Finnish, Fijian, Japanese, Kannada, Kyrgyz, Latin, Malayalam, Old English, Scottish Gaelic, and Vietnamese. While vowel length alone does not change word meaning in most dialects of English, it is said to do so in a few dialects, such as Australian English, Lunenburg English, New Zealand English, and South African English. It also plays a lesser phonetic role in Cantonese, unlike in other varieties of Chinese.

Many languages do not distinguish vowel length phonemically, meaning that vowel length does not change meaning, and the length of a vowel is conditioned by other factors such as the phonetic characteristics of the sounds around it, for instance whether the vowel is followed by a voiced or a voiceless consonant. Languages that do distinguish vowel length phonemically usually only distinguish between short vowels and long vowels. Very few languages distinguish three phonemic vowel lengths, such as Estonian, Luiseño, and Mixe. However, some languages with two vowel lengths also have words in which long vowels appear adjacent to other short or long vowels of the same type: Japanese hōō, "phoenix", or Ancient Greek ἀάατος , "inviolable". Some languages that do not ordinarily have phonemic vowel length but permit vowel hiatus may similarly exhibit sequences of identical vowel phonemes that yield phonetically long vowels, such as Georgian გააადვილებ , "you will facilitate it".

Related features
Stress is often reinforced by allophonic vowel length, especially when it is lexical. For example, French long vowels are always in stressed syllables. Finnish, a language with two phonemic lengths (i.e. vowel length changes meaning), indicates the stress by adding allophonic length, which gives four distinctive lengths and five physical lengths: short and long stressed vowels, short and long unstressed vowels, and a half-long vowel, which is a short vowel found in a syllable immediately preceded by a stressed short vowel: i-so.

Among the languages with distinctive vowel length, there are some in which it may occur only in stressed syllables, such as in Alemannic German, Scottish Gaelic and Egyptian Arabic. In languages such as Czech, Finnish, some Irish dialects and Classical Latin, vowel length is distinctive also in unstressed syllables.

In some languages, vowel length is sometimes better analyzed as a sequence of two identical vowels. In Finnic languages, such as Finnish, the simplest example follows from consonant gradation: haka → haan. In some cases, it is caused by a following chroneme, which is etymologically a consonant: jää "ice" ← Proto-Uralic *jäŋe. In non-initial syllables, it is ambiguous if long vowels are vowel clusters; poems written in the Kalevala meter often syllabicate between the vowels, and an (etymologically original) intervocalic -h- is seen in that and some modern dialects (taivaan vs. taivahan "of the sky"). Morphological treatment of diphthongs is essentially similar to long vowels. Some old Finnish long vowels have developed into diphthongs, but successive layers of borrowing have introduced the same long vowels again so the diphthong and the long vowel now again contrast (nuotti "musical note" vs. nootti "diplomatic note").

In Japanese, most long vowels are the results of the phonetic change of diphthongs; au and ou became ō, iu became yū, eu became yō, and now ei is becoming ē. The change also occurred after the loss of intervocalic phoneme . For example, modern Kyōto (Kyoto) has undergone a shift: . Another example is shōnen (boy): .

Phonemic vowel length
As noted above, only a relatively few of the world's languages make a phonemic distinction between long and short vowels; that is, saying the word with a long vowel changes the meaning over saying the same word with a short vowel. Examples of such languages include Arabic, Sanskrit, Japanese, Biblical Hebrew, Scottish Gaelic, Finnish, Hungarian, etc.

In Latin and Hungarian, some long vowels are analyzed as separate phonemes from short vowels:

Vowel length contrasts with more than two phonemic levels are rare, and several hypothesized cases of three-level vowel length can be analysed without postulating this typologically unusual configuration. Estonian has three distinctive lengths, but the third is suprasegmental, as it has developed from the allophonic variation caused by now-deleted grammatical markers. For example, half-long 'aa' in saada comes from the agglutination *saata+ka "send+(imperative)", and the overlong 'aa' in saada comes from *saa+ta "get+(infinitive)". As for languages that have three lengths, independent of vowel quality or syllable structure, these include Dinka, Mixe, Yavapai and Wichita. An example from Mixe is  "guava",  "spider",  "knot". In Dinka the longest vowels are three moras long, and so are best analyzed as overlong  etc.

Four-way distinctions have been claimed, but these are actually long-short distinctions on adjacent syllables.

By language

In English

Contrastive vowel length
In many varieties of English, vowels contrast with each other both in length and in quality, and descriptions differ in the relative importance given to these two features. Some descriptions of Received Pronunciation and more widely some descriptions of English phonology group all non-diphthongal vowels into the categories "long" and "short," convenient terms for grouping the many vowels of English. Daniel Jones proposed that phonetically similar pairs of long and short vowels could be grouped into single phonemes, distinguished by the presence or absence of phonological length (Chroneme). The usual long-short pairings for RP are /iː + ɪ/, /ɑː + æ/, /ɜ: + ə/, /ɔː + ɒ/, /u + ʊ/, but Jones omits /ɑː + æ/. This approach is not found in present-day descriptions of English. Vowels show allophonic variation in length and also in other features according to the context in which they occur. The terms tense (corresponding to long) and lax (corresponding to short) are alternative terms that do not directly refer to length.

The following are minimal pairs of length:

Allophonic vowel length
In most varieties of English, for instance Received Pronunciation and General American, there is allophonic variation in vowel length depending on the value of the consonant that follows it: vowels are shorter before voiceless consonants and are longer when they come before voiced consonants. Thus, the vowel in bad  is longer than the vowel in bat . Also compare neat  with need . The vowel sound in "beat" is generally pronounced for about 190 milliseconds, but the same vowel in "bead" lasts 350 milliseconds in normal speech, the voiced final consonant influencing vowel length.

Cockney English features short and long varieties of the closing diphthong . The short  corresponds to RP  in morphologically closed syllables (see thought split), whereas the long  corresponds to the non-prevocalic sequence  (see l-vocalization). The following are minimal pairs of length:

Furthermore, a vocalized word-final  is often restored before a word-initial vowel, so that fall out  (cf. thaw out , with an intrusive ) is somewhat more likely to contain the lateral  than fall . Before the intervocalic   is the banned diphthong, though here either of the  vowels can occur, depending on morphology (compare falling  with aweless ).

"Long" and "short" vowel letters in spelling and the classroom teaching of reading

The vowel sounds (phonetic values) of what are called "long vowels" and "short vowels" (less confusing would be "vowel letters", as the concept being articulated is about how the letter should be read) in the teaching of reading (and therefore in everyday English) are represented in this table. The descriptions "long" and "short" are not accurate from a linguistic point of view; in the case of Modern English, as the vowels are not actually long and short versions of the same sound as they once were in Middle English, they are different sounds and therefore different vowels, as is clearly shown by their phonetic qualities.

In English, the term "vowel" is often used to refer to vowel letters even though these often represent combinations of vowel sounds (diphthongs), approximants, and even silence, not just single vowel sounds (monophthongs). Most of this article covers the length of vowel sounds (not vowel letters) in English. Even classroom materials for teaching reading use the terms "long" and "short" in referring to vowel letters, while confusingly calling them "vowels". For example, in English spelling, vowel letters in words of the form consonant + vowel letter + consonant (CVC) are called "short" and "long" depending on whether or not they are followed by the letter e (CVC vs. CVCe) although those vowel letters called "long" actually represent combinations of two different vowels (diphthongs). Thus a vowel letter is called "long" if it is pronounced the same as the letter's name and "short" if it is not. This is commonly used for educational purposes when teaching children.

In some types of phonetic transcription (e.g. pronunciation respelling), "long" vowel letters may be marked with a macron; for example, ⟨ā⟩ may be used to represent the IPA sound /eɪ/. This is sometimes used in dictionaries, most notably in Merriam-Webster (see Pronunciation respelling for English for more).

Similarly, the short vowel letters are rarely represented in teaching reading of English in the classroom by the symbols ă, ĕ, ĭ, ŏ, o͝o, and ŭ. The long vowels are more often represented by a horizontal line above the vowel: ā, ē, ī, ō, o͞o, and ū.

Origin

Vowel length may often be traced to assimilation.

Another common source is the vocalization of a consonant such as the voiced velar fricative  or voiced palatal fricative or even an approximant, as the English 'r'. A historically-important example is the laryngeal theory, which states that long vowels in the Indo-European languages were formed from short vowels, followed by any one of the several "laryngeal" sounds of Proto-Indo-European (conventionally written h1, h2 and h3). When a laryngeal sound followed a vowel, it was later lost in most Indo-European languages, and the preceding vowel became long. However, Proto-Indo-European had long vowels of other origins as well, usually as the result of older sound changes, such as Szemerényi's law and Stang's law.

Vowel length may also have arisen as an allophonic quality of a single vowel phoneme, which may have then become split in two phonemes. For example, the Australian English phoneme  was created by the incomplete application of a rule extending  before certain voiced consonants, a phenomenon known as the bad–lad split. An alternative pathway to the phonemicization of allophonic vowel length is the shift of a vowel of a formerly-different quality to become the short counterpart of a vowel pair.

Estonian, a Finnic language, has a rare phenomenon in which allophonic length variation has become phonemic after the deletion of the suffixes causing the allophony. Estonian had already inherited two vowel lengths from Proto-Finnic, but a third one was then introduced. For example, the Finnic imperative marker *-k caused the preceding vowels to be articulated shorter. After the deletion of the marker, the allophonic length became phonemic, as shown in the example above.

Notations in the Latin alphabet

IPA
In the International Phonetic Alphabet the sign  (not a colon, but two triangles facing each other in an hourglass shape; Unicode ) is used for both vowel and consonant length. This may be doubled for an extra-long sound, or the top half may be used to indicate that a sound is "half long". A breve is used to mark an extra-short vowel or consonant.

Estonian has a three-way phonemic contrast:
saada  "to get" (overlong)
saada  "send!" (long)
sada  "hundred" (short)

Although not phonemic, a half-long distinction can also be illustrated in certain accents of English:
bead 
beat 
bid 
bit

Diacritics
 Macron (ā), used to indicate a long vowel in Māori, Hawaiian, Samoan, Latvian and many transcription schemes, including romanizations for Sanskrit and Arabic, the Hepburn romanization for Japanese, and Yale for Korean. While not part of their standard orthography, the macron is used as a teaching aid in modern Latin and Ancient Greek textbooks. Macron is also used in modern official Cyrillic orthographies of some minority languages (Mansi, Kildin Sami, Evenki).
 Breves (ă) are used to mark short vowels in several linguistic transcription systems, as well as in Vietnamese and Alvarez-Hale's orthography for O'odham language.
 Acute accent (á), used to indicate a long vowel in Czech, Slovak, Old Norse, Hungarian, Irish, traditional Scottish Gaelic (for long [oː] ó, [eː] é, as opposed to [ɛː] è, [ɔː] ò) and pre-20th-century transcriptions of Sanskrit, Arabic, etc.
 Circumflex (â), used for example in Welsh. The circumflex is occasionally used as a surrogate for the macrons, particularly in Hawaiian and in the Kunrei-shiki romanization of Japanese, or in transcriptions of Old High German. In transcriptions of Middle High German, a system where inherited lengths are marked with the circumflex and new lengths with the macron is occasionally used.
 Grave accent (à) is used in Scottish Gaelic, with a e i o u. (In traditional spelling, [ɛː] is è and [ɔː] is ò as in gnè, pòcaid, Mòr (personal name), while [eː] is é and [oː] is ó, as in dé, mór.)
 Ogonek (ą), used in Lithuanian to indicate long vowels.
 Trema (ä), used in Aymara to indicate long vowels.

Additional letters
 Vowel doubling, used consistently in Estonian, Finnish, Lombard, Navajo and Somali, and in closed syllables in Dutch, Afrikaans, and West Frisian. Example: Finnish tuuli  'wind' vs. tuli  'fire'.
 Estonian also has a rare "overlong" vowel length but does not distinguish it from the normal long vowel in writing, as they are distinguishable by context; see the example below.
 Consonant doubling after short vowels is very common in Swedish and other Germanic languages, including English. The system is somewhat inconsistent, especially in loanwords, around consonant clusters and with word-final nasal consonants. Examples:
 Consistent use: byta  'to change' vs bytta  'tub' and koma  'coma' vs komma  'to come'
 Inconsistent use: fält  'a field' and kam  'a comb' (but the verb 'to comb' is kamma)
 Classical Milanese orthography uses consonant doubling in closed short syllables, e.g., lenguagg 'language' and pubblegh 'public'.
 ie is used to mark the long  sound in German because of the preservation and the generalization of a historic ie spelling, which originally represented the sound . In Low German, a following e letter lengthens other vowels as well, e.g., in the name Kues .
 A following h is frequently used in German and older Swedish spelling, e.g., German Zahn  'tooth'.
 In Czech, the additional letter ů is used for the long U sound, and the character is known as a kroužek, e.g., kůň "horse".

Other signs
 Colon, from Americanist phonetic notation, and used in orthographies based on it such as Oʼodham, Mohawk or Seneca. The triangular colon  in the International Phonetic Alphabet derives from this.
 Middot or half-colon, a more common variant in the Americanist tradition, also used in language orthographies.
 Saltillo (straight apostrophe), used in Miꞌkmaq, as evidenced by the name itself. This is the convention of the Listuguj orthography (Miꞌgmaq), and a common substitution for the acute accent (Míkmaq) of the Francis-Smith orthography.

No distinction
Some languages make no distinction in writing. This is particularly the case with ancient languages such as Latin and Old English. Modern edited texts often use macrons with long vowels, however.

Notations in other writing systems
In non-Latin writing systems, a variety of mechanisms have also evolved.
Most of these scripts also have optional diacritics that can be used to mark short vowels when needed.
 In South-Asian abugidas, such as Devanagari or the Thai alphabet, there are different vowel signs for short and long vowels.
 In the Japanese hiragana syllabary, long vowels are usually indicated by adding a vowel character after. Thus:  (a), "okaasan", mother;  (i), にいがた "Niigata", city in northern Japan (usually , in kanji);  (u),  "ryuu" (usu. ), dragon.
 Most long vowels in the katakana syllabary are written with a special bar symbol  (vertical in vertical writing), called a chōon, as in  mēkā "maker" instead of  meka "mecha". However, some long vowels are written with additional vowel characters, as with hiragana, with the distinction being orthographically significant.
 In the Korean Hangul alphabet, vowel length is not distinguished in normal writing. Some dictionaries use a double dot, for example  "Daikon radish".
 In the Classic Maya script, also based on syllabic characters, long vowels in monosyllabic roots were generally written with word-final syllabic signs ending in the vowel -i rather than an echo-vowel. Hence, chaach "basket", with a long vowel, was written as cha-chi (compare chan "sky", with a short vowel, written as cha-na). If the nucleus of the syllable was itself i, however, the word-final vowel for indicating length was -a: tziik- "to count; to honour, to sanctify" was written as tzi-ka (compare sitz' "appetite", written as si-tz'i).

See also
Gemination
Length (phonetics)

References

External links

 Some Features of the Vernacular Finnish of Jyväskylä

Phonetics
Vowels